The Tulare County Sheriff's Office (TCSO) is an American law enforcement agency that is charged with law enforcement duties within the boundaries of Tulare County, California. As of the 2020 United States Census, the county was inhabited by 473,117 people.

Line of duty deaths
Since the department's establishment, 15 sworn officers and one police dog have died in the line of duty.

Officers:

K9:

References

External links
 

Government of Tulare County, California
Sheriffs' departments of California